1996 Nagoya Grampus Eight season

Review and events

League results summary

League results by round

Competitions

Domestic results

J.League

Emperor's Cup

J.League Cup

Super Cup

Suntory Cup

International results

Asian Cup Winners' Cup

Player statistics

 † player(s) joined the team after the opening of this season.

Transfers

In:

Out:

Transfers during the season

In
 Sié Donald Olivier (on March)
 Tomasz Frankowski (on May)
 Kunihiko Shiotake (Nagoya Grampus Eight youth)
 Yukio Shinbara (Nagoya Grampus Eight youth)

Out
 Tomasz Frankowski (on July)
 Hiroyasu Ibata (to Honda Motor)

Awards

J.League Best XI:  Stojković

References

Other pages
 J. League official site
 Nagoya Grampus official site

Nagoya Grampus Eight
Nagoya Grampus seasons